This article contains a list of fossil-bearing stratigraphic units in the state of California, U.S.

Sites

See also

 Paleontology in California

References

 

California
Stratigraphic units
Fossiliferous stratigraphic units
California geography-related lists
United States geology-related lists